Andon Nikolov (Bulgarian: Андон Николов) (born June 15, 1951) is a former Bulgarian weightlifter. He became Olympic Champion in 1972 in the Middle Heavyweight class.

References

External links

1951 births
Bulgarian male weightlifters
Weightlifters at the 1972 Summer Olympics
Olympic gold medalists for Bulgaria
Living people
Olympic medalists in weightlifting
Medalists at the 1972 Summer Olympics
20th-century Bulgarian people
21st-century Bulgarian people